The elections in India in 2014 include the Indian general election of 2014 and eight state legislative assembly elections. The tenure of the state legislative assemblies of Andhra Pradesh, Arunachal Pradesh, Haryana, Jammu and Kashmir, Maharashtra, Jharkhand, Odisha and Sikkim are due to expire during the year.

General election

The voting for the general elections started from 7 April 2014, and the results were announced on 16 May 2014. According to the Election Commission of India, the electoral strength in 2014 was 81.45 crores, the largest in the world.

Results by Alliance

|-
! style="text-align:left;vertical-align:bottom;" rowspan=2 colspan=2 |Party
! style="text-align:left;vertical-align:bottom;" rowspan=2 |Abbr.
! colspan=3|Candidates
! colspan=3|Votes
! colspan=3|Seats
! colspan=4|Alliance
|-
! No.
! +/-
! %
! Number
! %
! +/-
! No.
! +/-
! %
! colspan=2|Name
! Seats
! Votes
|-
| style="background-color:" |
| style="text-align:left;" |Bharatiya Janata Party
| style="text-align:left;" | BJP
| 427
|  -6
| 78.63%
| 171,660,230
| 31.00%
| 12.20%
| 282
| 166
| 51.93%
| style="background-color:"  rowspan="16"| 
| style="text-align:left;"  rowspan="16"|NDA
| style="text-align:left;"  rowspan="16"|336
| style="text-align:left;"  rowspan="16"|208,606,860 (37.64%)
|-
| style="background-color:" | || style="text-align:left;" |Shiv Sena  || style="text-align:left;" |SHS || 58 ||  11 || 10.68% || 10,262,544 || 1.85% || 0.30% || 18 || 7 || 3.31%
|-
| style="background-color:" | || style="text-align:left;" |Telugu Desam Party || style="text-align:left;" |TDP || 30 ||  -1 || 5.52% || 14,099,230 || 2.55% || 0.04% || 16 || 10 || 2.95%
|-
| style="background-color:" | || style="text-align:left;" |Lok Janshakti Party || style="text-align:left;" |LJP || 7 ||  -5 || 1.29% || 2,295,929 || 0.41% || 0.04% || 6 || 6 || 1.10%
|-
| style="background-color:" | || style="text-align:left;" |Shiromani Akali Dal  || style="text-align:left;" |SAD || 10 ||  || 1.84% || 3,636,148 || 0.66% || 0.30% || 4 ||  || 0.74%
|-
| style="background-color:" | || style="text-align:left;" |Rashtriya Lok Samta Party  || style="text-align:left;" |RLSP || 4 || New || 0.74% || 1,078,473 || 0.19% || New || 3 || New || 0.55%
|-
| style="background-color:" | || style="text-align:left;" |Apna Dal || style="text-align:left;" |AD || 7 ||  -36 || 1.29% || 821,820 || 0.15% || 0.03% || 2 || 2 || 0.37%
|-
| style="background-color:" | || style="text-align:left;" |Pattali Makkal Katchi  || style="text-align:left;" |PMK || 9 ||  2 || 1.66% || 1,827,566 || 0.33% || 0.14% || 1 || 1 || 0.18%
|-
| style="background-color:" | || style="text-align:left;" |Swabhimani Paksha  || style="text-align:left;" |SWP || 2 ||  1 || 0.37% || 1,105,073 || 0.20% || 0.08% || 1 ||  || 0.18%
|-
| style="background-color:" | || style="text-align:left;" |Naga People's Front || style="text-align:left;" |NPF || 2 ||  1 || 0.37% || 994,505 || 0.18% || 0.02% || 1 ||  || 0.18%
|-
| style="background-color:" | || style="text-align:left;" |All India N.R. Congress || style="text-align:left;" |AINRC || 1 || New || 0.18% || 255,826 || 0.05% || New || 1 || New || 0.18%
|-
| style="background-color:" | || style="text-align:left;" |Desiya Murpokku Dravida Kazhagam ||style="text-align:left;" |DMDK || 14 ||  -26 || 2.58% || 2,078,843 || 0.38% || 0.37% || 0 ||  || 0.00%
|-
| style="background-color:" | || style="text-align:left;" |Marumalarchi Dravida Munnetra Kazhagam || style="text-align:left;" |MDMK || 7 ||  3 || 1.29% || 1,417,535 || 0.26% || 0.01% || 0 || 1 || 0.00%
|-
| style="background-color:" | || style="text-align:left;" |Haryana Janhit Congress (BL) ||  style="text-align:left;" |HJCBL || 2 ||  -8 || 0.37% || 703,698 || 0.13% || 0.07% || 0 || 1 || 0.00%
|-
| style="background-color:" | || style="text-align:left;" |Rashtriya Samaj Paksha ||  style="text-align:left;" |RSPS || 5 ||  -27 || 0.92% || 458,480 || 0.08% || 0.03% || 0 ||  || 0.00%
|-
| style="background-color:" | || style="text-align:left;" |Republican Party of India (A) || style="text-align:left;" |RPI(A) || 45 ||  -10 || 8.10% || 206,689 || 0.04% || 0.05% || 0 ||  || 0.00%
|-
| style="background-color:" | || style="text-align:left;" |National People's Party ||  style="text-align:left;" |NPP || 7 ||  7 || 1.29% || 576,448 || 0.10% || New || 1 || New || 0.18%
|-
| style="background-color:" |
| style="text-align:left;" |Indian National Congress
| style="text-align:left;" |INC
| 464
|  24
| 85.45%
| 106,935,942
| 19.31%
| 9.24%
| 44
| 162
| 8.10%
| style="background-color:" rowspan="11"|
| style="text-align:left;" rowspan="10"| UPA
| style="text-align:left;"  rowspan="11"|60
| style="text-align:left;"  rowspan="11"|127,844,769 (23.06%)
|-
| style="background-color:" | || style="text-align:left;" |Nationalist Congress Party || style="text-align:left;" |NCP || 36 ||  -32 || 6.63% || 8,635,558 || 1.56% || 0.58% || 6 || 3 || 1.10%
|-
| style="background-color:" | || style="text-align:left;" |Rashtriya Janata Dal || style="text-align:left;" |RJD || 29 ||  -14 || 5.52% || 7,440,937 || 1.34% || 0.07% || 4 ||  || 0.74%
|-
| style="background-color:" | || style="text-align:left;" |Jharkhand Mukti Morcha || style="text-align:left;" |JMM || 21 ||  -21 || 3.87% || 1,637,994 || 0.30% || 0.10% || 2 ||  || 0.37%
|-
| style="background-color:" | || style="text-align:left;" |Indian Union Muslim League || style="text-align:left;" |IUML || 25 ||  8 || 4.60% || 1,100,096 || 0.20% || 0.01% || 2 ||  || 0.37%
|-
| style="background-color:" | || style="text-align:left;" |Kerala Congress (M) || style="text-align:left;" |KEC(M) || 1 ||  || 0.18% || 424,194 || 0.08% || 0.02% || 1 ||  || 0.18%
|-
| style="background-color:" | || style="text-align:left;" |Rashtriya Lok Dal || style="text-align:left;" |RLD || 10 ||  1 || 1.84% || 696,918 || 0.13% || 0.31% || 0 || 5 || 0.00%
|-
| style="background-color:" | || style="text-align:left;" |Jammu & Kashmir National Conference |
| style="text-align:left;" |JKNC || 3 ||  || 0.55% || 396,713 || 0.07% || 0.05% || 0 ||  || 0.00%
|-
| style="background-color:" | || style="text-align:left;" |Bodoland People's Front || style="text-align:left;" |BPF || 2 ||  || 0.37% || 330,106 || 0.06% || 0.10% || 0 || 1 || 0.00%
|-
| style="background-color:" | || style="text-align:left;" |Socialist Janata (Democratic) || style="text-align:left;" |SJD || 1 || New || 0.18% || 307,597 || 0.06% || New || 0 || New || 0.00%
|-
| style="background-color:" | || style="text-align:left;" |Revolutionary Socialist Party || style="text-align:left;" | RSP || 6 ||  -11 || 1.10% || 1,666,380 || 0.30% || 0.08% || 1 || 1 || 0.18% || style="text-align:left;"| LF, UPA
|-
| style="background-color:" | || style="text-align:left;" |Communist Party of India (Marxist) || style="text-align:left;" |CPI(M) || 93 ||  11 || 17.13% || 17,988,955 || 3.25% || 2.08% || 9 || 7 || 1.66% || style="background-color:" rowspan="3"| || style="text-align:left;" rowspan="2"|LF, LDF || style="text-align:left;"  rowspan="3"|10|| style="text-align:left;"  rowspan="3"|23,527,833 (4.24%)
|-
| style="background-color:" | || style="text-align:left;" |Communist Party of India || style="text-align:left;" |CPI || 67 ||  11 || 12.34% || 4,327,460 || 0.78% || 0.65% || 1 || 3 || 0.18%
|-
| style="background-color:" | || style="text-align:left;" |All India Forward Bloc || style="text-align:left;" |AIFB || 39 ||  17 || 7.18% || 1,211,418 || 0.22% || 0.16% || 0 || 2 || 0.00% || style="text-align:left;" |LF
|-
| style="background-color:" | || style="text-align:left;" |Quami Ekta Dal || style="text-align:left;" |QED || 9 || New || 1.66% || 354,577 || 0.06% || New || 0 || New || 0.00% || style="background-color:" rowspan="2"| || style="text-align:left;" rowspan="2"|EM || style="text-align:left;"  rowspan="2"|0 || style="text-align:left;"  rowspan="2"| 473,524 (0.08%)
|-
| style="background-color:" | || style="text-align:left;" |Suheldev Bhartiya Samaj Party || style="text-align:left;" |SBSP || 13 ||  -7 || 2.39% || 118,947 || 0.02% || 0.06% || 0 ||  || 0.00%
|-
| style="background-color:" | || style="text-align:left;" |Dravida Munnetra Kazhagam || style="text-align:left;" |DMK || 35 ||  13 || 6.45% || 9,631,246 || 1.74% || 0.09% || 0 || 18 || 0.00% || rowspan="4" | || style="text-align:left;" rowspan="4"|DPA || style="text-align:left;"  rowspan="4"|0 || style="text-align:left;"  rowspan="4"|10,736,847 (1.93%)
|-
| style="background-color:" | || style="text-align:left;" |Puthiya Tamilagam || style="text-align:left;" |PT || 1 ||  -2 || 0.18% || 262,812 || 0.05% || 0.02% || 0 ||  || 0.00%
|-
| style="background-color:" | || style="text-align:left;" |Manithaneya Makkal Katchi || style="text-align:left;" |MAMAK || 1 ||  -3 || 0.18% || 236,679 || 0.04% || 2.00% || 0 ||  || 0.00%
|-
| style="background-color:" | || style="text-align:left;" |Viduthalai Chiruthaigal Katchi || style="text-align:left;" |VCK || 2 ||  -1 || 0.37% || 606,110 || 0.11% || 0.07% || 0 || 1 || 0.00%
|-
| style="background-color:" | || style="text-align:left;" |All India Anna Dravida Munnetra Kazhagam || style="text-align:left;" |AIADMK || 40 ||  17 || 7.37% || 18,111,579 || 3.27% || 1.60% || 37 || 28 || 6.81% || rowspan="46" | || style="text-align:left;" rowspan="46"| Everyone Else || style="text-align:left;"  rowspan="46"|137 || style="text-align:left;"  rowspan="46"|190,121,841(34.31%)
|-
|-
| style="background-color:" | || style="text-align:left;" |All India Trinamool Congress ||  style="text-align:left;" |AITC || 131 ||  96 || 24.13% || 21,262,665 || 3.84% || 0.34% || 34 || 15 || 6.26%
|-
| style="background-color:" | || style="text-align:left;" |Biju Janata Dal || style="text-align:left;" |BJD || 21 ||  3 || 3.87% || 9,489,946 || 1.71% || 0.12% || 20 || 6 || 3.68%
|-
|-
| style="background-color:" | || style="text-align:left;" |Telangana Rashtra Samithi ||  style="text-align:left;" |TRS || 17 ||  8 || 3.13% || 6,736,270 || 1.22% || 0.60% || 11 || 9 || 2.03%
|-
| style="background-color:" | || style="text-align:left;" |YSR Congress Party || style="text-align:left;" |YSRCP || 38 || New || 7.00% || 13,995,435 || 2.53% || New || 9 || New || 1.66%
|-
| style="background-color:" | || style="text-align:left;" |Samajwadi Party ||  style="text-align:left;" |SP || 197 ||  4 || 36.28% || 18,673,089 || 3.37% || 0.05% || 5 || 18 || 0.92%
|-
| style="background-color:" | || style="text-align:left;" |Aam Aadmi Party || style="text-align:left;" |AAP || 432 || New || 79.56% || 11,325,387 || 2.05% || New || 4 || New || 0.74%
|-
| style="background-color:" | || style="text-align:left;" |All India United Democratic Front || style="text-align:left;" |AIUDF || 18 ||  -7 || 3.31% || 2,333,040 || 0.42% || 0.10% || 3 || 2 || 0.55%
|-
| style="background-color:" | || style="text-align:left;" |Jammu and Kashmir People's Democratic Party ||  style="text-align:left;" |JKPDP || 5 ||  -1 || 0.92% || 732,644 || 0.13% || 0.01% || 3 ||  || 0.55%
|-
| style="background-color:" | || style="text-align:left;" |Janata Dal (United) ||  style="text-align:left;" |JD(U) || 93 ||  38 || 17.13% || 5,992,281 || 1.08% || 0.44% || 2 || 18 || 0.37%
|-
| style="background-color:" | || style="text-align:left;" |Janata Dal (Secular) ||  style="text-align:left;" |JD(S) || 34 ||  1 || 6.26% || 3,731,481 || 0.67% || 0.15% || 2 || 1 || 0.37%
|-
| style="background-color:" | || style="text-align:left;" |Indian National Lok Dal || style="text-align:left;" |INLD || 10 ||  5 || 1.84% || 2,799,899 || 0.51% || 0.20% || 2 || 2 || 0.37%
|-
| style="background-color:" | || style="text-align:left;" |All India Majlis-E-Ittehadul Muslimeen ||  style="text-align:left;" |AIMIM || 5 ||  4 || 0.92% || 685,730 || 0.12% || 0.05% || 1 ||  || 0.18%
|-
| style="background-color:" | || style="text-align:left;" |Sikkim Democratic Front || style="text-align:left;" |SDF || 1 ||  || 0.18% || 163,698 || 0.03% || 0.01% || 1 ||  || 0.18%
|-
| style="background-color:" | || style="text-align:left;" |Bahujan Samaj Party || style="text-align:left;" |BSP || 503 ||  3 || 92.63% || 22,946,346 || 4.14% || 2.03% || 0 || 21 || 0.00%
|-
| style="background-color:" | || style="text-align:left;" |Jharkhand Vikas Morcha (Prajatantrik) ||style="text-align:left;" |JVM(P) || 16 ||  || 2.95% ||1,579,772 || 0.29% || 0.06% || 0 || 1 || 0.00%
|-
| style="background-color:" | || style="text-align:left;" |Communist Party of India (Marxist–Leninist) Liberation || style="text-align:left;" |CPI(ML)L || 82 ||  2 || 15.10% || 1,007,275 || 0.18% || 0.07% || 0 ||  || 0.00%
|-
| style="background-color:" | || style="text-align:left;" |Bahujan Mukti Party || style="text-align:left;" |BMP || 233 || New || 42.73% || 791,951 || 0.14% || New || 0 || New || 0.00%
|-
| style="background-color:" | || style="text-align:left;" |Maharashtra Navnirman Sena ||style="text-align:left;" |MNS || 10 ||  -1 || 1.84% || 708,010 || 0.13% || 0.23% || 0 ||  || 0.00%
|-
| style="background-color:" | || style="text-align:left;" |Asom Gana Parishad || style="text-align:left;" |AGP || 12 ||  6 || 2.21% || 577,730 || 0.10% || 0.33% || 0 || 1 || 0.00%
|-
| style="background-color:" | || style="text-align:left;" |Socialist Unity Centre of India (Communist) || style="text-align:left;" |SUCI(C) || 80 || ? || 14.73% || 520,972 || 0.09% || New || 0 || New || 0.00%
|-
| style="background-color:" | || style="text-align:left;" |Peace Party of India || style="text-align:left;" |PPI || 51 ||  31 || 9.39% || 518,724 || 0.09% || 0.04% || 0 ||  || 0.00%
|-
| style="background-color:" | || style="text-align:left;" |Peasants and Workers Party of India || style="text-align:left;" |PWPI || 3 ||  3 || 0.55% || 497,721 || 0.09% || New || 0 || New || 0.00%
|-
| style="background-color:" | || style="text-align:left;" |All Jharkhand Students Union || style="text-align:left;" |AJSU || 10 ||  4 || 1.84% || 488,719 || 0.09% || 0.05% || 0 ||  || 0.00%
|-
| style="background-color:" | || style="text-align:left;" |Social Democratic Party of India || style="text-align:left;" |SDPI || 29 || New || 5.34% || 396,524 || 0.07% || New || 0 || New || 0.00%
|-`
| style="background-color:" | || style="text-align:left;" |Bharipa Bahujan Mahasangh || style="text-align:left;" |BBM || 23 ||  -16 || 4.24% || 360,854 || 0.07% || 0.05% || 0 ||  || 0.00%
|-
| style="background-color:" | || style="text-align:left;" |Gondwana Ganatantra Party || style="text-align:left;" |GGP || 27 ||  -1 || 4.97% || 301,366 || 0.05% ||  || 0 ||  || 0.00%
|-
| style="background-color:" | || style="text-align:left;" |Bahujan Vikas Aaghadi || style="text-align:left;" |BVA || 1 ||  || 0.18% || 293,681 || 0.05% ||  || 0 || 1 || 0.00%
|-
| style="background-color:" | || style="text-align:left;" |Welfare Party of India || style="text-align:left;" |WPI || 25 || New || 4.60% || 228,642 || 0.04% || New || 0 || New || 0.00%
|-
|  || style="text-align:left;" |Jai Bharat Samanta Party || style="text-align:left;" |JBSP || 1 ||  -2 || 0.18% || 215,607 || 0.04% || 0.04% || 0 ||  || 0.00%
|-
|  || style="text-align:left;" |Jai Samaikyandhra Party || style="text-align:left;" |JaSPa || 27 || New || 4.97% || 204,260 || 0.04% || New || 0 || New || 0.00%
|-
|  || style="text-align:left;" |Jharkhand Party || style="text-align:left;" |JKP || 4 ||  -3 || 0.74% || 203,869 || 0.04% || 0.01% || 0 ||  || 0.00%
|-
| style="background-color:" | || style="text-align:left;" |Pyramid Party of India || style="text-align:left;" |PPOI || 38 ||  -13 || 7.00% || 185,478 || 0.03% || 0.04% || 0 ||  || 0.00%
|-
| style="background-color:" | || style="text-align:left;" |Ambedkarite Party of India || style="text-align:left;" |API || 34 || New || 6.26% || 185,095 || 0.03% || New || 0 || New || 0.00%
|-
| style="background-color:" | || style="text-align:left;" |Lok Satta Party || style="text-align:left;" |LSP || 7 ||  -25 || 1.29% || 165,670 || 0.03% || 0.10% || 0 ||  || 0.00%
|-
| style="background-color:" | || style="text-align:left;" |Aama Odisha Party || style="text-align:left;" |AOP || 9 || New || 1.66% || 155,900 || 0.03% || New || 0 || New || 0.00%
|-
| style="background-color:" | || style="text-align:left;" |National Unionist Zamindara Party || style="text-align:left;" |NUZP || 3 || New || 0.55% || 124,990 || 0.02% || New || 0 || New || 0.00%
|-
| style="background-color:" | || style="text-align:left;" |Sikkim Krantikari Morcha || style="text-align:left;" |SKM || 1 || New || 0.18% || 121,956 || 0.02% || New || 0 || New || 0.00%
|-
|-
| style="background-color:" | || style="text-align:left;" |Communist Party of India (Marxist-Leninist) Red Star || style="text-align:left;" |CPI(ML)RS || 47 || New || 8.66% || 114,323 || 0.02% || New || 0 || New || 0.00%
|-
|  || style="text-align:left;" |Marxist Co-ordination Committee || style="text-align:left;" |MCO || 1 ||  -1 || 0.18% || 110,185 || 0.02% ||  || 0 ||  || 0.00%
|-
| style="background-color:" | || style="text-align:left;" |Jharkhand Disom Party || style="text-align:left;" |JDP || 19 ||  10 || 3.50% || 109,843 || 0.02% ||  || 0 ||  || 0.00%
|-
| style="background-color:" | || style="text-align:left;" |United Democratic Party || style="text-align:left;" |UDP || 1 ||  || 0.18% || 106,817 || 0.02% || 0.01% || 0 ||  || 0.00%
|-
| style="background-color:" | || style="text-align:left;" |Independent || style="text-align:left;" |IND || 3,235 ||  596 || || 16,743,719 || 3.02% || -2.17% || 3 || -6 || 0.55%
|-
| style="background-color:" | || style="text-align:left;" |Others ||  || 1,182 || || || 4,023,271 || 0.73% || -4.14% || 0 ||  || 0.00%
|-
| style="background-color:" | || style="text-align:left;" |None of the above || style="text-align:left;" |NOTA || ||  ||  || 6,000,197 || 1.08% || New || 0 || New || 0.00%
|- style="font-weight:bold" class="sortbottom"
| colspan=3 style="text-align:left;" |Valid Votes || ||  ||  || 553,802,946 || 99.93% ||  || 543 ||  || 100.00% ||  colspan="4" style="background-color:#E9E9E9"  |
|- class="sortbottom"
| colspan=3 style="text-align:left;" |Rejected Votes ||  || ||  || 372,309 || 0.07%
| colspan="8" rowspan="3" style="background-color:#E9E9E9"  |
|- class="sortbottom"
| colspan=3 style="text-align:left;" |Total Polled/Turnout || ||  ||  || 554,175,255 || 66.44%
|- class="sortbottom"
| colspan=3 style="text-align:left;" |Registered Electors || ||  ||  || 834,082,814 ||   colspan="1" style="background-color:#E9E9E9"  |
|- class="sortbottom"
| colspan=16 style="text-align:left;" |Sources: Election Commission of India  Election Commission of India
|}

Parliamentary By-election

Legislative Assembly elections

In 2014, legislative assembly elections took place for eight states Andhra Pradesh, Arunachal Pradesh, Haryana, Jammu and Kashmir, Jharkhand, Maharashtra, Odisha and Sikkim. In first phase, the legislative elections in Andhra Pradesh, Odisha and Sikkim will take place along with Lok Sabha elections. The elections in Andhra Pradesh will be for the two states which will be created on 2 June, Telangana and Andhra Pradesh(post division).

Andhra Pradesh

Assembly elections to the 294-member Andhra Pradesh assembly were held on 30 April and 7 May 2014. Once the province was officially split on 2 June, this election yielded legislators for Telangana and Andhra Pradesh(Rayalaseema & coastal Andhra).

In Andhra Pradesh (Rayalaseema & coastal Andhra), TDP-BJP alliance got majority in 175 member legislative assembly. N. Chandrababu Naidu became the Chief Minister of Andhra Pradesh.

In Telangana, Telangana Rashtra Samiti got majority in 119 member Telangana Legislative Assembly. Kalvakuntla Chandrashekar Rao became the Chief Minister of Telangana.

Arunachal Pradesh

Assembly elections to the 60-member Arunachal Pradesh assembly were held on 9 April 2014. Nabam Tuki continues as the Chief Minister of Arunachal Pradesh.

Odisha

Assembly elections to the 147-member Odisha assembly were held on 10 April and 17 April 2014. The results were declared on 16 May 2014. Naveen Patnaik continues as the Chief Minister of Odisha.

|- align=center
!style="background-color:#E9E9E9" class="unsortable"|
!style="background-color:#E9E9E9" align=center|Political Party
!style="background-color:#E9E9E9" |Seats won
!style="background-color:#E9E9E9" |Number of Votes
!style="background-color:#E9E9E9" |% of Votes
!style="background-color:#E9E9E9" |Seat change
|-style="background: #90EE90;"
| 
|align="left"|Biju Janata Dal||117||9,334,852||43.4|| 14
|-
| 
|align="left"|Indian National Congress||16||5,535,670||25.7|| 11
|-
| 
|align="left"|Bharatiya Janata Party||10||3,874,739||18.0|| 4
|-
| 
|align="left"|Communist Party of India (Marxist)||1||80,274||0.4|| 1
|-
| 
|align="left"|Samata Kranti Dal||1||86,539||0.4|| 1
|-
| 
|align="left"|Independents||2||1,084,764||5.0|| 4
|-
|
|align="left"|Total||147||||||
|-
|}

Sikkim

Assembly elections to the 32-member Sikkim assembly were held on 12 April 2014. Votes were counted and results were declared on 16 May 2014. SDF lost 10 seats to SKM resulting in formation of opposition in the assembly which did not exist in previous assembly. Pawan Kumar Chamling continues as the Chief Minister of Sikkim.

Maharashtra

Devendra Fadnavis became the Chief Minister of Maharashtra.

Haryana

Manohar Lal Khattar became the Chief Minister of Haryana.

Jammu and Kashmir

Jharkhand

The tenure of the Legislative Assembly of Jharkhand expires on 3 January 2015. Assembly elections of Jharkhand have been held on November–December 2014.

Assembly By-elections

Andhra Pradesh

Arunachal Pradesh

Assam

Bihar

Chhattisgarh

Gujarat

Karnataka

Madhya Pradesh

Manipur

Nagaland

Punjab

Rajasthan

Sikkim

Tripura

Uttar Pradesh

Uttarakhand

West Bengal

See also
V. S. Sampath

References

External links

 Election Commission of India

2014 elections in India
India
2014 in India
Elections in India by year